Fever Heat is a 1968 American drama film directed by Russell S. Doughten and written by Henry Gregor Felsen. The film stars Nick Adams, Jeannine Riley, Norman Alden, Vaughn Taylor, Daxson Thomas and Robert Broyles. The film was released in May 1968, by Paramount Pictures.

Plot

Cast  
Nick Adams as Ace Jones
Jeannine Riley as Sandy Richards
Norman Alden as Herbert Herpgruve
Vaughn Taylor as Toad Taplinger
Daxson Thomas as Ronnie Richards
Robert Broyles as Loren Peale
Al Ruscio as Al Demarco
Skip Nelson as Track Announcer
Walt Reno Jr. as Makin
Ron Foreman as Duke Ossman
Mary Walker as Irma Peale
Alvin Meyer as Customer
John Doughten as Driver #1
Art Breese as Bob Towner
Cliff Carr as Cliff
Matt Moro as Matt
Lon Parsons as Chip Van
Sharon Baum as Lois Towner
Dwayne Bacon as Driver #2
Robert McClelland as Driver #3
Art Greco as Jensen

Production
The film was shot in Dexter, Iowa.

See also
List of American films of 1968

References

External links 
 

1968 films
Paramount Pictures films
American auto racing films
American drama films
1968 drama films
Films produced by Russell S. Doughten
Films shot in Iowa
1960s English-language films
1960s American films